Tibbits may refer to:

People with the surname
George Tibbits, American politician and a member of the United States House of Representatives from New York
George Tibbits (composer) (1933–2008), Australian composer and architect
James Tibbits Willmore (1800–1863), English engraver
Richard Tibbits (born 1846), insurance agent and political figure in New Brunswick, Canada

Fictional characters
Benjamin "Benny" Tibbits or Flux (comics), fictional gamma empowered soldier in the Marvel Comics universe

Buildings
Tibbits House, also known as Tibbits Hall, a historic home located at Hoosick in Rensselaer County, New York
Tibbits Opera House, the second oldest theatre in Michigan, having been built in 1882
 Tibbits Hall, a residence building on UNB Fredericton campus, New Brunswick, Canada

See also
Tebbit
Tibbets (disambiguation)
Tibbetts (disambiguation)